Germanic toponyms are the names given to places by Germanic peoples and tribes. Besides areas with current speakers of Germanic languages, many regions with previous Germanic speakers or Germanic influence had or still have Germanic toponymic elements, such as places in Northern France, Wallonia, Poland and Northern Italy.

Comparative table
In round brackets, the contemporary cognate for the toponym in the respective language is given. In the square brackets, the most frequently used name in English is given.

See also
Germanic names
Dutch names
German names
Norman toponymy (includes Old Norse placenames in Normandy)
German toponymy
Celtic toponymy
Placenames in the United Kingdom and Ireland

References 

Place name etymologies
Toponymy